Oliver Davis may refer to:

Oliver Davis (actor) (born 1993), American child actor
Oliver Davis (composer) (born 1972), English composer
Oliver Davis (American football) (born 1954), American football cornerback

See also
Oliver Leydon-Davis (born 1990), New Zealand badminton player
Oliver Davies (disambiguation)